This is a list of the mammal species recorded in North Korea. There are 105 mammal species in North Korea, of which none are critically endangered, seven are endangered, six are vulnerable, and three are near threatened. One of the species listed for North Korea is considered to be extinct.

The following tags are used to highlight each species' conservation status as assessed by the International Union for Conservation of Nature:

Some species were assessed using an earlier set of criteria. Species assessed using this system have the following instead of near threatened and least concern categories:

Order: Rodentia (rodents) 

Rodents make up the largest order of mammals, with over 40% of mammalian species. They have two incisors in the upper and lower jaw which grow continually and must be kept short by gnawing.

Suborder: Sciurognathi
Family: Sciuridae (squirrels)
Subfamily: Sciurinae
Tribe: Sciurini
Genus: Sciurus
 Red squirrel, Sciurus vulgaris NT
Tribe: Pteromyini
Genus: Pteromys
 Siberian flying squirrel, Pteromys volans LR/nt
Subfamily: Xerinae
Tribe: Marmotini
Genus: Eutamias
 Siberian chipmunk, Eutamias sibiricus LR/lc
Family: Cricetidae
Subfamily: Cricetinae
Genus: Cricetulus
 Chinese striped hamster, Cricetulus barabensis LR/lc
Genus: Tscherskia
 Greater long-tailed hamster, Tscherskia triton LR/lc
Subfamily: Arvicolinae
Genus: Clethrionomys
 Grey red-backed vole, Clethrionomys rufocanus LR/lc
 Northern red-backed vole, Clethrionomys rutilus LR/lc
Genus: Eothenomys
 Royal vole, Eothenomys regulus LR/lc
Family: Muridae (mice, rats, voles, gerbils, hamsters, etc.)
Subfamily: Murinae
Genus: Apodemus
 Striped field mouse, Apodemus agrarius LR/lc
 Korean field mouse, Apodemus peninsulae LR/lc
Genus: Micromys
 Harvest mouse, Micromys minutus LR/nt
Genus: Rattus
 Tanezumi rat, Rattus tanezumi LR/lc

Order: Lagomorpha (lagomorphs) 

The lagomorphs comprise two families, Leporidae (hares and rabbits), and Ochotonidae (pikas). Though they can resemble rodents, and were classified as a superfamily in that order until the early 20th century, they have since been considered a separate order. They differ from rodents in a number of physical characteristics, such as having four incisors in the upper jaw rather than two.

Family: Leporidae (rabbits, hares)
Genus: Lepus
 Korean hare, L. coreanus 
 Manchurian hare, L. mandshuricus  presence uncertain

Order: Erinaceomorpha (hedgehogs and gymnures) 

The order Erinaceomorpha contains a single family, Erinaceidae, which comprise the hedgehogs and gymnures. The hedgehogs are easily recognised by their spines while gymnures look more like large rats.

Family: Erinaceidae (hedgehogs)
Subfamily: Erinaceinae
Genus: Erinaceus
 Amur hedgehog, Erinaceus amurensis LR/lc

Order: Soricomorpha (shrews, moles, and solenodons) 

The "shrew-forms" are insectivorous mammals. The shrews and solenodons closely resemble mice while the moles are stout-bodied burrowers.

Family: Soricidae (shrews)
Subfamily: Crocidurinae
Genus: Crocidura
 Ussuri white-toothed shrew, Crocidura lasiura LR/lc
 Lesser white-toothed shrew, Crocidura suaveolens LR/lc
Subfamily: Soricinae
Tribe: Nectogalini
Genus: Neomys
 Eurasian water shrew, Neomys fodiens LR/lc
Tribe: Soricini
Genus: Sorex
 Laxmann's shrew, Sorex caecutiens LR/lc
 Slender shrew, Sorex gracillimus LR/lc
 Taiga shrew, Sorex isodon LR/lc
 Ussuri shrew, Sorex mirabilis LR/lc
Family: Talpidae (moles)
Subfamily: Talpinae
Tribe: Talpini
Genus: Mogera
 Large mole, Mogera robusta LR/lc

Order: Chiroptera (bats) 

The bats' most distinguishing feature is that their forelimbs are developed as wings, making them the only mammals capable of flight. Bat species account for about 20% of all mammals.

Family: Vespertilionidae
Subfamily: Myotinae
Genus: Myotis
 Far Eastern myotis, Myotis bombinus LR/nt
 Daubenton's bat, Myotis daubentonii LR/lc
 Hodgson's bat, Myotis formosus LR/lc
 Fraternal myotis, Myotis frater LR/nt
 Ikonnikov's bat, Myotis ikonnikovi LR/lc
 Whiskered bat, Myotis mystacinus LR/lc
 Natterer's bat, Myotis nattereri LR/lc
Subfamily: Vespertilioninae
Genus: Eptesicus
 Kobayashi's bat, Eptesicus kobayashii DD
 Northern bat, Eptesicus nilssoni LR/lc
 Serotine bat, Eptesicus serotinus LR/lc
Genus: Hypsugo
 Savi's pipistrelle, Hypsugo savii LR/lc
Genus: Nyctalus
 Birdlike noctule, Nyctalus aviator LR/nt
Genus: Plecotus
 Long-eared bat, Plecotus sp. (erroneously reported as P. auritus)
Genus: Vespertilio
 Parti-coloured bat, Vespertilio murinus LR/lc
 Asian parti-colored bat, Vespertilio superans LR/lc
Subfamily: Murininae
Genus: Murina
 Little tube-nosed bat, Murina aurata LR/nt
 Greater tube-nosed bat, Murina leucogaster LR/lc
 Ussuri tube-nosed bat, Murina ussuriensis EN
Subfamily: Miniopterinae
Genus: Miniopterus
 Schreibers' long-fingered bat, Miniopterus schreibersii LC
Family: Molossidae
Genus: Tadarida
 European free-tailed bat, Tadarida teniotis LR/lc
Family: Rhinolophidae
Subfamily: Rhinolophinae
Genus: Rhinolophus
 Greater horseshoe bat, Rhinolophus ferrumequinum LR/nt

Order: Cetacea (whales, dolphins, porpoises) 

The order Cetacea includes whales, dolphins and porpoises. They are the mammals most fully adapted to aquatic life with a spindle-shaped nearly hairless body, protected by a thick layer of blubber, and forelimbs and tail modified to provide propulsion underwater.

Suborder: Mysticeti (baleen whales)
Family: Balaenidae (right and bowhead whales)
Genus: Balaena
 Bowhead whale, Balaena mysticetus (Sea of Okhotsk) EN
Genus: Eubalaena
 North Pacific right whale, Eubalaena japonica CR 
Family: Eschrichtiidae (gray whale)
Genus: Eschrichtius
 Western gray whale, Eschrichtius robustus CR 
Family: Balaenopteridae (rorquals)
Subfamily: Megapterinae
Genus: Megaptera
 Humpback whale, Megaptera novaeangliae (Sea of Japan and Yellow/Bohai Seas) EN
Subfamily: Balaenopterinae
Genus: Balaenoptera
 Common minke whale, Balaenoptera acutorostrata ( Sea of Japan and Yellow/Bohai Sea)EN
 Northern sei whale, Balaenoptera borealis EN
 Northern fin whale, Balaenoptera physalus physalus (Coastal Asia) CR 
 Northern blue whale, Balaenoptera musculus musculus (Coastal Asia) CR 
Suborder: Odontoceti (toothed whales)
Superfamily: Platanistoidea
Family: Phocoenidae
Genus: Neophocaena
 Sunameri, Neophocaena phocaenoides phocaenoides VU
Genus: Phocoena
 Harbour porpoise, Phocoena phocoena VU
Genus: Phocoenoides
 Dall's porpoise, Phocoenoides dalli LR/cd
Family: Physeteridae
Genus: Physeter
 Sperm whale, Physeter macrocephalus VU
Family: Kogiidae
Genus: Kogia
 Pygmy sperm whale, Kogia breviceps LR/lc
 Dwarf sperm whale, Kogia sima LR/lc
Family: Ziphidae (beaked whales)
Genus: Berardius
 Baird's beaked whale, Berardius bairdii LR/cd
Genus: Mesoplodon
 Blainville's beaked whale, Mesoplodon densirostris DD
 Ginkgo-toothed beaked whale, Mesoplodon ginkgodens DD
 Stejneger's beaked whale, Mesoplodon stejnegeri DD
Genus: Ziphius
 Cuvier's beaked whale, Ziphius cavirostris DD
Family: Delphinidae (marine dolphins)
Genus: Steno
 Rough-toothed dolphin, Steno bredanensis DD
Genus: Stenella
 Pantropical spotted dolphin, Stenella attenuata LR/cd
 Striped dolphin, Stenella coeruleoalba LR/cd
 Spinner dolphin, Stenella longirostris LR/cd
Genus: Delphinus
 Long-beaked common dolphin, Delphinus capensis LR/lc
 Short-beaked common dolphin, Delphinus delphis LR/lc
Genus: Tursiops
 Common bottlenose dolphin, Tursiops truncatus LR/lc
Genus: Lissodelphis
 Northern right whale dolphin, Lissodelphis borealis LR/lc
Genus: Sagmatias
 Pacific white-sided dolphin, Sagmatias obliquidens LR/lc
Genus: Orcinus
 Orca, Orcinus orca (Sea of Japan and Yellow/Bohai Seas) EN
Genus: Pseudorca
 False killer whale, Pseudorca crassidens DD
Genus: Feresa
 Pygmy killer whale, Feresa attenuata DD
Genus: Globicephala
 Short-finned pilot whale, Globicephala macrorhyncus DD
Genus: Grampus
 Risso's dolphin, Grampus griseus DD

Order: Carnivora (carnivorans) 

There are over 260 species of carnivorans, the majority of which feed primarily on meat. They have a characteristic skull shape and dentition.

Suborder: Feliformia
Family: Felidae (cats)
Subfamily: Felinae
Genus: Lynx
 Eurasian lynx, L. lynx  
Genus: Prionailurus
 Leopard cat, P. bengalensis  
Subfamily: Pantherinae
Genus: Panthera
 Leopard, P. pardus  possibly extirpated
 Amur leopard, P. p. orientalis   possibly extirpated
 Tiger, P. tigris  possibly extirpated
 Siberian tiger, P. t. tigris   possibly extirpated
Suborder: Caniformia
Family: Canidae (dogs, foxes)
Genus: Canis
 Gray wolf, C.lupus 
 Mongolian wolf, C. l. chanco  
Genus: Cuon
 Dhole, C. alpinus  presence uncertain
Genus: Nyctereutes
 Raccoon dog, N. procyonoides  
Genus: Vulpes
 Red fox, V. vulpes
 Korean fox, V. v. peculiosa  
Family: Ursidae (bears)
Genus: Ursus
 Brown bear, U. arctos 
 Ussuri brown bear, U. a. lasiotus 
 Asiatic black bear, U. thibetanus 
Family: Mustelidae (mustelids)
Genus: Lutra
 European otter, L. lutra 
Genus: Martes
 Yellow-throated marten, Martes flavigula LR/lc
 Sable, Martes zibellina LR/lc
Genus: Meles
 Asian badger, Meles leucurus LR/lc
Genus: Mustela
 Mountain weasel, Mustela altaica LR/lc
 Least weasel, Mustela nivalis LR/lc
 Siberian weasel, Mustela sibirica LR/lc
Family: Otariidae (eared seals, sealions)
Genus: Callorhinus
 Northern fur seal, Callorhinus ursinus 
Genus: Eumetopias
 Steller's sea lion, Eumetopias jubatus  vagrant
Genus: Zalophus
 Japanese sea lion, Zalophus japonicus 
Family: Phocidae (earless seals)
Genus: Phoca
 Spotted seal, Phoca largha 
 Harbor seal, Phoca vitulina LR/lc
Genus: Pusa
 Ringed seal, Pusa hispida LR/lc

Order: Artiodactyla (even-toed ungulates) 

The even-toed ungulates are ungulates whose weight is borne about equally by the third and fourth toes, rather than mostly or entirely by the third as in perissodactyls. There are about 220 artiodactyl species, including many that are of great economic importance to humans.

Family: Suidae (pigs)
Subfamily: Suinae
Genus: Sus
 Wild boar, Sus scrofa LR/lc
Family: Moschidae
Genus: Moschus
 Siberian musk deer, Moschus moschiferus 
Family: Cervidae (deer)
Subfamily: Cervinae
Genus: Cervus
 Elk, C. canadensis 
 Manchurian wapiti, C. c. xanthopygus
 Sika deer, C. nippon  possibly extirpated
 Manchurian sika deer, C. n. mantchuricus LC possibly extirpated
Subfamily: Hydropotinae
Genus: Hydropotes
 Water deer, Hydropotes inermis LR/nt
 Korean water deer, Hydropotes inermis argyropus
Subfamily: Capreolinae
Genus: Capreolus
 Siberian roe deer, Capreolus pygargus LR/lc
Family: Bovidae (cattle, antelopes, sheep, goats)
Subfamily: Caprinae
Genus: Nemorhaedus
 Long-tailed goral, Nemorhaedus caudatus  possibly extirpated

See also
 Wildlife of Korea
 List of mammals of South Korea
 List of chordate orders
 Lists of mammals by region
 Mammal classification

Notes

References
 

 
Mammals
North K
North Korea